Karel Absolon (16 June 1877 – 6 October 1960) was a Czech archaeologist, geographer, paleontologist, and speleologist. He was born in Boskovice.

Absolon was the grandchild of paleontologist Jindřich Wankel. During his studies at Charles University in Prague he started with speleological research in the caves of Moravský kras (Moravian Karst) in the Moravia of what is now the Czech Republic. In 1907 he became the custodian of the Moravian museum in Brno and a professor of paleoanthropology at the Charles University in Prague in 1926.

His most known works are the paleoanthropologic discoveries at Dolní Věstonice which include a Venus figurine. He worked on the systemic mapping of the Moravský kras, including the Macocha Abyss and the Pekárna, Punkevní and Kateřinská caves. He also explored karstic caves in the Balkans, France, and England. Absolon was very skilled in promoting himself and in popularizing his discoveries as a way to lure sponsors.

Absolon died on 6 October 1960 in Brno. In 1961 a cave on the foot of Mt. Maggiore in the Italian Apuan Alps was discovered and named after Absolon.

See also
Venus of Dolní Věstonice

References

External links 
 Absolon biography (in Czech)
 Půtová, B.: Natural history objects, casts and reconstructions and their role in scientific work in the 19th and 20th century: Karel Absolon's collecting activity. Anthropologie: International Journal of Human Diversity and Evolution 59(2), 2021, s. 113−132.

Czech paleontologists
Czech archaeologists
Speleologists
People from Boskovice
1877 births
1960 deaths
Burials at Brno Central Cemetery
Charles University alumni